Brian C. Fay (born October 5, 1943) is an American philosopher and William Griffin Professor of Philosophy at Wesleyan University. He is known for his works on the philosophy of social sciences.

Books
 Social Theory and Political Practice (1975)
 Critical Social Science: Liberation and its Limits (1987)
 Contemporary Philosophy of Social Science: A Multicultural Approach (1996)
 Louis Mink: Historical Understanding (ed.) (1987) 
 History and Theory: Contemporary Readings (ed.) (1998)

References

External links
Brian C. Fay

21st-century American philosophers
Phenomenologists
Continental philosophers
Political philosophers
Social philosophers
Philosophy academics
Wesleyan University faculty
Gadamer scholars
Living people
Alumni of the University of Oxford
Loyola Marymount University alumni
Philosophy journal editors
1943 births
Philosophers of social science